Fleece may refer to:

Materials
 Fleeces, woollen coats of a domestic sheep or long-haired goat, especially after being shorn
 Polar fleece, a type of polyester fabric
 Fleece jacket, a lightweight casual jacket
 Horticultural fleece, a polypropylene fabric used to protect plants

See also
 Golden Fleece (disambiguation)
 Fleece Hotel, Gloucester, England
 The Fleece Inn, Worcestershire, England
 Flyssa, a traditional weapon of the Berbers
 Fleece (band), a Canadian indie rock band